Samuel Chimsoro (13 February 1949 – 6 July 2016) was a Zimbabwean poet and novelist who published in both English and Shona.

Early life and education
Chimsoro was born on 13 February 1949, in Mrewa in the Mashonaland East Province of Zimbabwe (then known as Rhodesia). He attended Nyatsime College, the first  privately black owned secondary school in Zimbabwe. He then trained as a laboratory technician with a focus on radiation detection. He worked for the government of Zimbabwe before moving to the National University of Science and Technology (NUST).

Career
Chimsoro published his first volume of poetry, Smoke and Flames, in 1978. In the same year he published a Shona-language short story, "Hoyiyo ne Hohwa", which would later be used for instruction in primary schools.  These were followed by 
Nothing is Impossible, a novel inspired by the life of Paul Mukondo, in 1983, and the Shona poetry collection Dama rekutanga: muunganidzwa wenhetembo (Dama rekutanga: the first promise) in 1990. Chimsoro's works deal with themes of colonialism, racial discrimination, and Zimbabwean politics.

Death
Chimsoro died on 6 July 2016 in Umgugu Village, Zhombe, Zimbabwe.

Bibliography 
 Smoke and Flames: Poems (Mambo Press, 1978)
 Nothing is Impossible (Longman, 1983)
 Dama rekutanga: muunganidzwa wenhetembo (College Press, 1990)

References

1949 births
2016 deaths
20th-century Zimbabwean writers